

The J. C. Penney House in Kemmerer, Wyoming was the home of James Cash Penney, the founder of the J. C. Penney department stores, during the 1904-1909 period that he developed his formula for a successful dry goods store. Penney and wife moved to Kemmerer in 1902 and lived in the garret of a small house. With a child, it was too small, and Penney bought this two-storey house in 1904.

During this period he was operating the "mother store" of the future J.C. Penney empire.

It is now operated as a house museum at least during the summer.

It was listed on the National Register of Historic Places in 1976, and is a contributing property to the J. C. Penney Historic District, a National Historic Landmark.

Further reading
"James Cash Penney: From Clerk to Chain-store Tycoon", at Wyoming State Hist

See also
National Register of Historic Places listings in Lincoln County, Wyoming

References

External links
 J.C. Penney House - museum information at Wyoming State Historical Society
J.C. Penney House, at Wyoming State Historic Preservation Office, with photo from front

Houses on the National Register of Historic Places in Wyoming
Houses in Lincoln County, Wyoming
Museums in Lincoln County, Wyoming
Historic house museums in Wyoming
Houses completed in 1904
JCPenney
National Register of Historic Places in Lincoln County, Wyoming
Kemmerer, Wyoming